Mark Wilkinson (born 18 April 1989), better known by his stage name Wilkinson, is an English record producer, DJ and remixer from Hammersmith, England. He has released music on RAM Records and Hospital Records, as well as Virgin EMI. His 2013 single "Afterglow" with vocals by Becky Hill reached number 8 on the UK Singles Chart on 20 October 2013.

Music career

2010–2016: RAM Records and Lazers Not Included

On 13 December 2010, Wilkinson released his debut single "Moonwalker / Samurai" through RAM Records. The tracks were first premiered through Andy C's drum and bass compilation album Nightlife 5. On 12 June 2011, he released the single "Every Time / Overdose", which became the 99th single release of RAM Records. "Every Time" features vocals from Marcus Gregg and it became Wilkinson's first song to spawn a music video. On 4 December 2011, he released "Tonight / Pistol Whip". "Tonight" was later re-released in 2013 as the iTunes Single of the Week to promote the release of his debut studio album Lazers Not Included. On 19 August 2012, he released the single "Automatic / Hands Up!". Although it received mixed feedback and significantly less airplay, "Automatic" still managed to gain support from the likes of Annie Mac and MistaJam.

On 2 December 2012, he released "Need to Know / Direction" featuring Iman as the lead single from his debut studio album. On 3 April 2013, he released "Take You Higher / Crunch" as the next single from the album. On 26 July 2013, he released "Heartbeat" featuring P Money and Arlissa as the third single from his debut studio album. On 13 October 2013, he released "Afterglow" as the fourth single from his debut studio album. The song peaked at number 8 on the UK Singles Chart, making it his first top 10 single in the UK. On 28 October 2013, he released his debut studio album Lazers Not Included. The album peaked at number 46 on the UK Albums Chart and number 2 on the UK Dance Chart. On 9 February 2014, he released "Too Close" featuring Detour City as the album's fifth single, which peaked at number 55 in the UK. The album's sixth single "Half Light" (featuring Tom Cane) charted at number 25 in the UK, making it Wilkinson's second top 40 single. It was released on 1 June 2014.

Since the release of Lazers Not Included, Wilkinson has worked on music with Katy B, Wretch 32, Angel Haze and Knytro. On 14 July 2014, a new single entitled "Dirty Love" premiered on MistaJam's BBC Radio 1Xtra show. The song features vocals from Talay Riley, and was released on 12 October 2014. The song later featured on the "extended edition" of Lazers Not Included, which was released on 20 October 2014. This new edition of his debut album, originally titled Lazers Not Included 2.0, was to be released on 18 August 2014 and was to feature six previously unheard songs. However, these plans were scrapped and the extended edition instead featured numerous remixes of and by Wilkinson alongside the new single.

On 2 October 2014, he embarked on his Lazers Not Included tour with support from Etherwood, I See MONSTAS and Toyboy & Robin on selected dates. The tour began in Bournemouth and finished in Cambridge. A new song with Shannon Saunders (with whom he is in a relationship), entitled "Breathe", premiered in Bournemouth. His next single, a collaboration with TC entitled "Hit the Floor", was released exclusively to Beatport on 12 January 2015 and elsewhere on 26 January. The song was pressed to a number of limited edition picture discs for Record Store Day 2015. On 6 March 2015, his next single entitled "Hopelessly Coping" (featuring Thabo) premiered on Annie Mac's Radio 1 show. It was released on 17 May 2015 alongside remixes from Gorgon City, René LaVice, Preditah and Hanami. The song entered the UK Singles Chart at number 49. On 24 August 2015, "Breathe" was released as a free download, accompanied by a music video. The song is also available on digital retailers.

2016–2018: Hypnotic
"Flatline", the lead single from Wilkinson's forthcoming second studio album, Hypnotic, features vocals from Wretch 32 and was released on 12 March 2016. This was followed by "What", featuring uncredited vocals from MC Ad-Apt and "Sweet Lies", featuring vocals from Karen Harding. Hypnotic was released on 21 April 2017. He released the song Rush with Dimension in November 2017.

In 2018, Wilkinson released the singles "Take It Up" (with Sub Focus), "Decompression" and "I Need" (feat. Hayla). 2019 saw the release of the UKF10 sampler which contained Wilkinson's song "Machina".

2019–2021: Portals and Sleepless Music 
In September 2019, Wilkinson and Sub Focus released "Illumiunate" as a first single for their album Portals, released on 9 October 2020. Their second single, "Just Hold On", came out in April 2020. In July 2020, it was announced that Wilkinson is scheduled to perform at the 2021 SW4 (South West Four Weekender) festival. Later single to follow were "Air I Breathe", "Turn the Lights Off" and "Freedom" featuring Empara Mi. The album was released on 9 October 2020.

On 18 February 2021, Wilkinson announced the launch of his new record label, Sleepless Music. The label would go on to release future Wilkinson music and include releases from the likes of S.P.Y, Fred V, Krakota and many more.

2022–present: Cognition
After releasing the singles "Frontline", "If You Want It", "Keep Dancing" (featuring Amber Van Day) and "Used to This" (featuring Issey Cross, No. 14 on the UK Dance Singles Chart) in 2021, Wilkinson announced his fourth studio album Cognition, released in February 2022.

In 2022, the singles "Close Your Eyes" (featuring Iiola) and "Here for You" (with Becky Hill) were released.

The Artwork for Cognition was a collaborative effort with Folkestone-based collage artist Charlie Elms, aka 10 Years Time.

Discography

Studio albums

Singles

Featured singles

Promotional singles

Other charted songs

Other appearances

Remixes

Production credits

References

Notes

a  "Need to Know" did not chart on the Ultratop's Belgian Flanders Single's Chart, but it did chart at number 55 on the Ultratip chart, the top-100 songs which haven't made the Ultratop 50.
b  Becky Hill was uncredited on this single originally, but has become part of her official discography on the officialcharts.com site when the single re-entered the Top 100.
c  "Afterglow" did not chart on the Ultratop's Belgian Flanders Single's Chart, but it did chart at number 4 on the Ultratip chart, the top-100 songs which haven't made the Ultratop 50.
d  Re-release of 2011 single as iTunes Single of the Week to promote the release of the album
e  Other Wilkinson tracks featured on the release, but "Scream It" was the only exclusive track to the compilation.
f  It is also exclusively on the vinyl edition of Lazers Not Included.

Sources

External links
Official website

Remixers
English record producers
Living people
1994 births
English drum and bass musicians
DJs from London
Electronic dance music DJs
RAM Records artists